Ferdinand, 5th Prince Kinsky of Wchinitz and Tettau (5 December 17813 November 1812) was the 5th Prince Kinsky of Wchinitz and Tettau.

Early life
Ferdinand was born at Vienna, Habsburg monarchy as the elder son of Joseph, 4th Prince Kinsky of Wchinitz and Tettau (1751–1798) and Countess Rosa of Harrach of Rohrau and Thannhausen (1758–1814). He became Prince upon the death of his father in 1798. In 1809 he became one of Ludwig van Beethoven's important patrons.

Marriage and family
Ferdinand married on 8 June 1801 in Prague to Baroness Maria Charlotte of Kerpen (1782–1841), second daughter of Baron Lothar Franz Christoph of Kerpen, and his wife, Baroness Maria Charlotte Mohr of Wald.

They had two children:
Rudolf, 6th Prince Kinsky of Wchinitz and Tettau (30 March 1802 – 27 January 1836), married in 1825 to Countess Wilhelmine of Colloredo-Mansfeld; had issue.
Count Joseph Sidonius Kinsky of Wchinitz and Tettau (25 October 1806 – 17 July 1862), married in 1828 to Countess Marie Henriette Czernin of Chudenitz; had issue.

Ancestry

Notes and sources
Genealogisches Handbuch des Adels, Fürstliche Häuser, Reference: 1956

|- 

1781 births
1812 deaths
House of Kinsky
Nobility from Vienna
Knights Cross of the Military Order of Maria Theresa